Nan Contree, also spelt Nan Contrée, is a village in the Aquin commune of the Aquin Arrondissement, in the Sud department of Haiti.

References

Populated places in Sud (department)